Thrombospondin-2 is a protein that in humans is encoded by the THBS2 gene.

The protein encoded by this gene belongs to the thrombospondin family. It is a disulfide-linked homotrimeric glycoprotein that mediates cell-to-cell and cell-to-matrix interactions. The role of the protein in cancer is controversial, contrasting studies show positive and negative roles for cancer development.  Studies of the mouse counterpart suggest that this protein may modulate the cell surface properties of mesenchymal cells and be involved in cell adhesion and migration.

Interactions 

THBS2 has been shown to interact with MMP2.

References

Further reading 

 
 
 
 
 
 
 
 
 
 
 
 
 
 
 
 
 
 

Thrombospondins